Persephone is a 1939 painting by the American painter Thomas Hart Benton. It depicts the Greek goddess Persephone, resting nude by a tree in a rural Midwestern setting. Benton, dressed in farmer's clothes, plays the role of Pluto and peeks from behind the tree.

It was painted at the Kansas City Art Institute where Benton worked as a teacher. Several of Benton's students also made their own versions of the subject. A reporter from Life visited Benton in his studio during his work on this painting and his other famous nude painting from the same period, Susanna and the Elders.

The model for Persephone was Imogene Bruton. Bruton modeled for students at the school in the 1930s but abandoned modeling after completing Persephone. She married in 1940, and was later unwilling to talk about her time as a model.

The Nelson-Atkins Museum of Art in Kansas City bought the painting in 1986. The museum paid $2,500,000, which was a new record for a Benton painting.

The painting inspired Imogen and Twinka at Yosemite, a 1974 photograph by Judy Dater.

References

 Thomas Craven, A Treasury of Art Masterpieces from the Renaissance to the Present Day, New York: Simon and Schuster, 1939, pp. 578–79
 Thomas Craven, A Descriptive Catalog of the Works of Thomas Hart Benton: Spotlighting the Important Periods during the Artist’s Thirty-two Years of Painting, exhibition catalog, New York: Associated American Artists, 1939, cat. #45

External links
 Persephone at the Nelson-Atkins Museum of Art

Persephone
1939 paintings
Nude art
Paintings by Thomas Hart Benton
Paintings depicting Greek myths
Paintings in Kansas
Paintings in the collection of the Nelson-Atkins Museum of Art
Paintings of goddesses